Glaphyropoma rodriguesi is a species of pencil catfish endemic to Brazil.  This species grows to a length of  SL.

Etymology
The catfish is named in honor of herpetologist Miguel Trefaut Rodrigues (b. 1953), of the Universidade de São Paulo, who, along with his students, collected and discovered the first-known specimens of this subfamily from a high-altitude region of north-eastern central Brazil.

References
 

Trichomycteridae
Catfish of South America
Freshwater fish of Brazil
Endemic fauna of Brazil
Taxa named by Mário Cesar Cardoso de Pinna
Fish described in 1992